Partners in Crime is the fifth studio album by British-American singer-songwriter and musician Rupert Holmes, released on August 5, 1979. The album was Holmes's most commercially successful record and includes all three of Holmes's solo top 40 hits: "Him", "Answering Machine", and "Escape (The Piña Colada Song)." "Escape" was the Billboard #1 hit of December 1979 and January 1980; it was the only single to hold the #1 position in both years and in different decades. Although "Escape (The Piña Colada Song)" was released as a single on Infinity Records, "Him" was released on MCA Records; the Infinity catalog had been absorbed by MCA at the time the latter single was released. The album itself reached #33 on the Billboard Album Charts.

Track listing
All songs are written and arranged by Rupert Holmes.

Personnel

Musicians
 Rupert Holmes – vocals, keyboards, synthesizer, saxophone
 Dean Bailin – guitar
 Frank Gravis – bass
 Leo Adamian – drums , double drums 
 Victoria – percussion
 Peter Gordon – French horn
 Wayne Andre – trombone
 Dave Taylor – bass trombone
 The Gene Orloff Section – strings
 Steve Jordan – double drums 
 Chrissy Faith – background vocals 
 Bob Gurland – voiced trumpet

Production
 Rupert Holmes – production
 Jim Boyer – production, engineering, mixing
 Eric Bloch – associate engineering
 Ollie Cotton – associate engineering
 Ted Jensen – mastering
 Normand Kurtz – executive production

Artwork
 Peter Corriston – art direction, cover concept and design
 Brian Hagiwara – photography

Chart performance

In Australia (Kent Music Report), the album peaked at 59.

References

1979 debut albums
Infinity Records albums
MCA Records albums
Rupert Holmes albums
Albums produced by Jim Boyer (audio engineer)